Walter Aldo Capozucchi (born February 7, 1967 in San Isidro (Buenos Aires), Argentina) is a former Argentine footballer who played for clubs of Argentina, Chile and Guatemala.

Teams
  Platense 1986–1990
  Atlético Tucumán 1991–1993
  All Boys 1993–1994
  Everton 1994–1995
  Sportivo Italiano 1996
  Los Andes 1997
  C.S.D. Comunicaciones 1998
  Juventud Escuintleca 1998–1999

References
 

1967 births
Living people
Argentine footballers
Argentine expatriate footballers
Club Atlético Platense footballers
Club Atlético Los Andes footballers
Atlético Tucumán footballers
All Boys footballers
Comunicaciones F.C. players
Everton de Viña del Mar footballers
Chilean Primera División players
Argentine Primera División players
Expatriate footballers in Chile
Expatriate footballers in Guatemala
Association footballers not categorized by position
People from San Isidro, Buenos Aires
Sportspeople from Buenos Aires Province